Annie Bélanger is a Canadian ice hockey goaltender, currently with the Professional Women's Hockey Players Association (PWHPA).

Career 

Bélanger played four seasons at the University of Connecticut. In her final season, she was named Hockey East Goaltender of the Year and a Hockey East First-Team All-Star. She would graduate with the university's all-time record for save percentage.

Bélanger was drafted 17th overall by Calgary in the 2018 Canadian Women's Hockey League (CWHL) Draft. In her rookie CWHL season, she would serve as the team's backup behind Alex Rigsby, posting 8 wins in 9 games. She would earn back-to-back shutouts in her first two games. The team would win the Clarkson Cup that year.

In May 2019, Bélanger joined the PWHPA after the collapse of the CWHL.

Personal life 

Bélanger has a degree in finance.

Career statistics

References

External links
 

1994 births
Living people
Calgary Inferno players
Canadian women's ice hockey goaltenders
French Quebecers
Ice hockey people from Quebec
Professional Women's Hockey Players Association players
Sportspeople from Sherbrooke
UConn Huskies women's ice hockey players
University of Connecticut alumni